Guaraniella is a genus of South American comb-footed spiders that was first described by L. Baert in 1984.  it contains two species, found in Paraguay and Brazil: G. bracata and G. mahnerti.

See also
 List of Theridiidae species

References

Araneomorphae genera
Spiders of South America
Theridiidae